Olympia Heights is a census-designated place  in Miami-Dade County, Florida, United States. The population was 12,873 at the 2020 census.

Geography
It is bordered to the north by Westchester, to the northwest by Coral Terrace, to the east by Glenvar Heights, to the south by Sunset, and to the west by Westwood Lakes.

Demographics

2020 census

As of the 2020 United States census, there were 12,873 people, 4,049 households, and 3,106 families residing in the CDP.

2000 census
As of the census of 2000, there were 13,452 people, 4,157 households, and 3,487 families residing in the CDP. The racial makeup of the CDP was 93.50% White (of which 22.3% were Non-Hispanic White,) 0.83% African American, 0.10% Native American, 0.91% Asian, 2.46% from other races, and 2.19% from two or more races. Hispanic or Latino of any race were 76.33% of the population.

There were 4,157 households, out of which 30.2% had children under the age of 18 living with them, 65.2% were married couples living together, 13.6% had a female householder with no husband present, and 16.1% were non-families. 12.4% of all households were made up of individuals, and 6.8% had someone living alone who was 65 years of age or older.  The average household size was 3.22 and the average family size was 3.41.

In the CDP, the population was spread out, with 20.0% under the age of 18, 7.7% from 18 to 24, 26.7% from 25 to 44, 26.1% from 45 to 64, and 19.6% who were 65 years of age or older.  The median age was 42 years. For every 100 females, there were 91.8 males.  For every 100 females age 18 and over, there were 88.9 males.

The median income for a household in the CDP was $50,720, and the median income for a family was $54,533. Males had a median income of $34,382 versus $23,406 for females. The per capita income for the CDP was $18,198.  About 5.4% of families and 6.9% of the population were below the poverty line, including 5.8% of those under age 18 and 10.9% of those age 65 or over.

As of 2000, speakers of Spanish  as a first language accounted for 80.44% of residents, while English as a mother tongue made up 19.55% of the population.

As of 2000, Olympia Heights had the sixth highest percentage of Cuban residents in the US, with 57.65% of the populace. It also had the seventy-seventh highest percentage of Colombian residents in the US, at 1.99% of the population, and the twenty-fifth highest percentage of Nicaraguan residents in the US, at 1.80% of its population.

Education

Miami-Dade County Public Schools serves Olympia Heights.

Blue Lakes Elementary School is in Olympia Heights. Blue Lakes Elementary school's address is 9250 SW 52nd Terrace, Miami, FL 33165. Olympia Heights Elementary School is located in University Park CDP, adjacent to Olympia Heights. Olympia Heights Elementary school's address is 9797 SW 40th St, Miami, FL 33165.

Southwest Miami High School is located in Olympia Heights.

Private schools in Olympia Heights include Gulliver Pinecrest Preparatory School Miller Drive Campus, Florida Christian School, and King's Christian School. Pinecrest Preparatory opened in 1996.

Florida International University, as of the 2020 U.S. Census, is in the Westchester census-designated place. In the 1990 U.S. Census it was in the Olympia Heights CDP.

References

External links
 Blue Lakes Elementary School
 Olympia Heights Elementary School

Census-designated places in Miami-Dade County, Florida
Census-designated places in Florida